Phelsuma dorsivittata is a species of gecko endemic to northern Madagascar.

References

Phelsuma
Endemic fauna of Madagascar
Reptiles of Madagascar
Reptiles described in 1964